KolibriOS, or Kolibri, is a small, open-source x86 operating system written completely in assembly. It was forked from MenuetOS in 2004 and has run under independent development since.

In a 2009 review piece on alternative operating systems, TechRadar called it "tremendously impressive", noting its performance and streamlined codebase.

Features
 Pre-emptive multitasking, streams, and parallel execution of system calls
 Boots in a few seconds from various devices, with support for NTFS and Ext2/3/4; can also boot from Coreboot and Windows (Windows will shut down)
 Graphical user interface based on, and optimised for, VESA
 Development kit: code editor with an integrated macro assembler (FASM)
 Most distributions will fit on a single 1.44 MB floppy disk image

Commands
The following is a list of commands supported by the KolibriOS Shell:

 about
 alias
 cd
 clear
 cp
 date
 echo
 exit
 free
 help
 history
 kill
 ls
 mkdir
 more
 ps
 pwd
 reboot
 rm
 rmdir
 shutdown
 sleep
 touch
 uptime
 ver

System requirements
 i586-compatible CPU
 8 MB of RAM
 VESA-compatible graphics card
 1.44 MB 3.5" floppy drive, hard disk drive, USB Flash drive or CD-ROM drive
 Keyboard and mouse (COM, PS/2 or USB)

Supported hardware
 USB 1.1 and 2.0 are supported (UHCI, OHCI and EHCI). There is also support for USB hubs, although the only USB HID devices  supported include keyboard, mouse and USB flash drives.
 Storage: internal hard disks with PATA/IDE and SATA/AHCI interfaces are supported natively. 
 File systems: supported file systems include FAT12, FAT16, FAT32 (long names support), ext2, ext3 and ext4 (partially), CDFS (including multisession, read-only), NTFS (read and write but no extended functions such as encryption) and XFS (read-only)
 Audio: AC'97 audio codec support for Intel, nForce, nForce2, nForce3, nForce4, SIS7012, FM801, VT8233, VT8233C, VT8235, VT8237, VT8237R, VT8237R Plus and EMU10K1X chipsets. Intel High Definition Audio is supported on certain motherboards.
 Video: works on any card and specific drivers are available for AMD and Intel chipsets
 Network: TCP/IP stack and certain Ethernet network cards support

Development branches
 KolibriACPI: extended ACPI support
 Kolibri-A: Exokernel version of KolibriOS optimized for embedded applications and hardware engineering; only few AMD APU-based platforms are currently supported.

Reception 
Dedoimedo.com reviewed KolibriOS in 2012:

Jesse Smith from DistroWatch Weekly wrote the following review about KolibriOS in 2009:

See also

 MenuetOS - MenuetOS (32-bit version) upon which KolibriOS is based.

References

Further reading 
 Kolibri-A: a lightweight 32-bit OS for AMD platforms—University of Exeter, PCCAT 2011 p. 20-22 (2011)

External links

Floppy disk-based operating systems
Free software operating systems
Assembly language software
X86 operating systems
Lightweight Unix-like systems
Hobbyist operating systems